X-Factor/ Nhân tố bí ẩn is the Vietnamese version of The X Factor, a show originating from the United Kingdom. It is a television music talent show for aspiring pop singers drawn from public auditions. Based on the original UK show, and an addition to the X Factor franchise, the series found new singing talent (solo artists and groups ages 12 and over), drawn from public auditions, and they competed against each other for votes. The winner was determined by the show's viewers via telephone, the Internet, and SMS text voting, and was awarded a recording contract and 500 million VND.

History
By the end of 2013, Cát Tiên Sa announced that they would produce The X Factor, a new singing competition, as a substitute for another television program, The Voice of Vietnam. The Vietnamese version of the show is called Nhân tố bí ẩn. In 2015, it was announced that the show will be airing once every two years, alternating with The Voice.

Format

Categories
The show is primarily concerned with identifying singing talent, though appearance, personality, stage presence and dance routines are also an important element of many performances. Each judge is assigned one of four categories, to use their experience to help the artists. The categories are: "Boys" (aged 16–24 males), "Girls" (aged 16–24 females), "Over 25s" (solo acts aged 25 and over), and "Groups" (including duos). Through the live shows, the judges act as mentors to their category, helping to decide song choices, styling and staging, while judging contestants from other categories, and also vote to save or eliminate contestants.

Stages for seasons 1
There are five stages to the competition:
 Stage 1: Producers' auditions (these auditions decide who will sing in front of the judges)
 Stage 2: Judges' auditions
 Stage 3: Six-chair challenge
 Stage 4: Judges' houses
 Stage 5: Live shows (finals)

Stages for seasons 2
There are five stages to the competition:
 Stage 1: Producers' auditions (these auditions decide who will sing in front of the judges)
 Stage 2: Judges' auditions
 Stage 3: Boot camp
 Stage 4: Four-chair challenge & wildcard
 Stage 5: Live shows (finals)

Auditions
The show allows solo artists and vocal groups aged 16 and above, with no upper age limit, to compete. Applicants first upload a video audition to the Internet. The show's producers will decide who is qualified for the Judges' auditions. The producers' auditions are not televised. A selection of the auditions in front of the judges – usually the best, the worst and the most bizarre – are broadcast during the first few weeks of the show. The judges' auditions are held in front of a live audience, and the acts sing over a backing track. If at least three judges say "yes", the act goes through to the next stage, otherwise they are eliminated.

Boot camp and judges' houses

Live shows
The live shows feature the contestants' live performances and also at the end of the night, reveal the results of the public voting, culminating in one or more acts being eliminated. A difference in judge's vote in the Vietnamese version and other countries' versions is that there will be a bottom three instead of bottom two every live show. The judges will vote to save one contestant in the bottom three from elimination, and then the result will be reverted to the earlier public votes. The actual number of votes cast for each act is not revealed, nor even the order.

Also, different from the UK version, four contestants advance to the finals instead of three.

Judges
Shortly after the announcement to launch The X Factor, Hồ Quỳnh Hương was confirmed by Cát Tiên Sa as the first judge, while two former coaches from The Voice, Hồ Ngọc Hà and Đàm Vĩnh Hưng, were also announced to be joining the show. The fourth judge was not announced until the first day of filming the Judges' audition on March 4, 2014, Dương Khắc Linh was revealed as the last judge. Hồ Ngọc Hà and Đàm Vĩnh Hưng both quit before season 2 was launched. On the day the Judges' audition was filmed, the judging panel for season 2 was officially revealed with Dương Khắc Linh and Hồ Quỳnh Hương returning, while Thanh Lam and Tùng Dương replaced Hồ Ngọc Hà and Đàm Vĩnh Hưng respectively.

Judges' categories and their contestants
In each season, each judge is given a category to mentor and chooses small three to four acts (normally three, the fourth act is usually a wildcard) to progress to the live finals. This table shows which category each judge was allocated and which acts he or she put through to the live finals.

 – Winning judge/category. Winners are in bold, eliminated contestants in small font.

Series overview
To date, two seasons have been broadcast, as summarized below.

 Contestant in (or mentor of) "Boys" category
 Contestant in (or mentor of) "Girls" category
 Contestant in (or mentor of) "Over 25s" category
 Contestant in (or mentor of) "Groups" category

References

List of television programmes broadcast by Vietnam Television (VTV)

Vietnamese reality television series
2010s Vietnamese television series
Vietnamese television series based on British television series